Dicheniotes is a genus of tephritid  or fruit flies in the family Tephritidae.

Species
Dicheniotes acclivis Munro, 1947
Dicheniotes angulicornis (Hendel, 1931)
Dicheniotes dispar (Bezzi, 1924)
Dicheniotes distigma (Bezzi, 1924)
Dicheniotes erosa (Bezzi, 1924)
Dicheniotes katonae (Bezzi, 1924)
Dicheniotes multipunctatus Merz & Dawah, 2005
Dicheniotes polyspila (Bezzi, 1924)
Dicheniotes sexfissata (Becker, 1909)
Dicheniotes tephronota (Bezzi, 1908)
Dicheniotes turgens Munro, 1947

References

Tephritinae
Tephritidae genera
Diptera of Africa
Diptera of Asia